Bude is a town in Franklin County, Mississippi, United States. The population was 1,063 at the 2010 census. Bude is located on the north bank of the Homochitto River, which bisects the county on a diagonal running from northeast to southwest, where it flows on its way to the Mississippi River. U.S. Routes 98 and 84 run by Bude.

American Railcar Industries operates a large maintenance shop in Bude.

Bude appeared in a March 2017 segment of 60 Minutes because its chess team won the state championship.

History
Bude was founded by European Americans in 1912 and named for the former home in England of Mrs. F.L. Peck, whose husband was one of the town's founders.

Geography
Bude is located in central Franklin County. US 84 leads east  to Brookhaven, and US 98 leads southeast  to McComb. The two highways together lead west  to Natchez.

As the town is in the center of southwest Mississippi, there is a Mississippi Public Broadcasting radio and TV antenna located in the town.

Demographics

As of the 2020 United States census, there were 780 people, 359 households, and 175 families residing in the town.

Economy
The First and Main Cafe is located in Bude.

Education
Bude is served by the Franklin County School District.

In popular culture
Bude is mentioned in John Grisham's novel The Chamber:
The white male selected a phone number.  His conversation went something like this: "Hello, this is Lester Crosby, from Bude, Mississippi.  I'm calling about the execution of Sam Cayhall.  Yes ma'am.  My number?  It's 555-9084.  Yes, that's right, Bude, Mississippi, down here in Franklin County."

Notable people
 Regina B. Schofield, former U.S. Assistant Attorney General for the Office of Justice Programs.  At Schofield's confirmation hearing in 2005, Trent Lott, born in Grenada, said:I am very proud of her background, being from Bude, Mississippi. It is a long way from Bude, Mississippi, to Washington, D.C., and the Justice Department. In fact, if I gave you a map, you probably couldn't find it, but you have got some areas in Kansas pretty far out at the end of the road, too. It is a lot of beautiful people, and I know that community is very proud of Regina and her achievements.

References

Towns in Franklin County, Mississippi
Towns in Mississippi